Homer Samuel Ferguson (February 25, 1889December 17, 1982) was an American attorney, professor, judge, United States senator from Michigan, Ambassador to the Philippines, and later a judge on the United States Court of Military Appeals.

Education and early career
Ferguson attended public schools and the University of Pittsburgh. He graduated from the University of Michigan at Ann Arbor in 1913, was admitted to the bar the same year and commenced practice in Detroit. He was judge of the circuit court for Wayne County, Michigan, from 1929 to 1942 and also professor of law at Detroit College of Law (now part of Michigan State University) from 1929 to 1939.

Senator
Elected as a Republican to the United States Senate in 1942 and was reelected in 1948, serving from January 3, 1943, to January 3, 1955. Ferguson successfully was re-elected in 1948 over Democrat Frank E. Hook in a year dominated by the Democratic party's upset wins. The election was contested by Hook, who alleged fraud; a subcommittee uncovered unethical practices in the election cycle, though it exonerated Ferguson, who was seated.

He unsuccessfully ran for reelection to a third-term in 1954, defeated by Democrat Patrick V. McNamara.

While in the Senate, he served as chairman of the Republican Policy Committee in the 83rd United States Congress.

In 1943, Ferguson was one of 12 senators who sponsored or co-sponsored the Rescue Resolution, which would have declared that Congress "recommends and urges the creation by the President of a commission of diplomatic, economic, and military experts to formulate and effectuate a plan of immediate action designed to save the surviving Jewish people of Europe from extinction at the hands of Nazi Germany."

In 1948, he served as chairman of the Investigations Subcommittee of the Committee on Expenditures in Executive Departments, which held hearings on such matters as export control violations, for which Soviet spy William Remington was called in to testify; the trial of Nazi war criminal Ilse Koch; and the Mississippi Democratic Party's sale of postal jobs, which Mississippians from rural areas attested to purchasing. On July 30, 1948, his committee heard testimony from ex-Soviet spy Elizabeth Bentley. Bentley testified before the House Un-American Activities Committee the next day, followed by Whittaker Chambers a few days later – setting off the Hiss Case, used by both Richard Nixon and Joseph McCarthy for their own political agendas.

Ferguson sponsored an anti-lynching bill, which was approved by the Senate Judiciary Committee in June 1949. The House of Representatives had approved several anti-lynching bills. Due to opposition from Southern Democrats, no anti-lynching bill was ever approved by the full Senate.

He introduced the Senate version of the bill that inserted "under God" into the Pledge of Allegiance in 1954. Michigan's 17th congressional district United States House of Representatives Republican Charles G. Oakman had previously introduced a House version. The bill became law on Flag Day, June 14, 1954.

Also in 1954, Ferguson proposed several amendments to the Bricker Amendment.

Later life
Ferguson served as United States Ambassador to the Philippines from 1955 to 1956 and was judge of the United States Court of Military Appeals in Washington, D.C., from 1956 to until his retirement 1971. He served as senior judge on the United States Court of Military Appeals from 1971 to 1976.

In 1976, he retired and moved back to Michigan and resided in Grosse Pointe until his death in 1982.

Ferguson's involvement behind the scenes in influencing the failed investigation, trial, and slander of Preston Tucker by the Securities and Exchange Commission has long been speculated. Lloyd Bridges portrayed Ferguson in the 1988 film Tucker: The Man and His Dream in which Tucker was played by the elder actor's son Jeff Bridges.

References

Sources

The Political Graveyard

External links 
 Homer Ferguson Papers 1939-1976, collection maintained by University of Michigan
 
 
 

|-

|-

|-

|-

1889 births
1982 deaths
Activists for African-American civil rights
American anti-lynching activists
Ambassadors of the United States to the Philippines
Burials at Woodlawn Cemetery (Detroit)
Detroit College of Law faculty
Judges of the United States Court of Appeals for the Armed Forces
Michigan lawyers
Michigan Republicans
Michigan state court judges
People from Westmoreland County, Pennsylvania
Republican Party United States senators from Michigan
University of Michigan Law School alumni
20th-century American judges
University of Pittsburgh alumni
20th-century American diplomats
20th-century American politicians
United States Article I federal judges appointed by Dwight D. Eisenhower